Essex is an unincorporated community in Flathead County, Montana, United States. Amtrak's Empire Builder makes a flag stop at Essex station, westbound at 7:41pm and eastbound at 8:55am. The Izaak Walton Inn hotel is close to the Amtrak station platform. Essex also is home to a small BNSF Railway yard. Historically, it was used to provide coal and water for steam trains, and to station helper units used to push freight trains over Marias Pass. It is still used to base snow-clearing crews in wintertime.

Named for a county in England, Essex (originally known as Walton) began as a small town on the Great Northern Railway’s main line in 1890.

Demographics

References

Further reading

2005 Empire Builder Magazine
Empire Builder Timetable

Unincorporated communities in Flathead County, Montana
Unincorporated communities in Montana